Andrzej Żyła (born 24 November 1946) is a Polish luger. He competed in the men's doubles event at the 1976 Winter Olympics.

References

1946 births
Living people
Polish male lugers
Olympic lugers of Poland
Lugers at the 1976 Winter Olympics
People from Karkonosze County